Mixel Pixel was a music/video project based in Brooklyn, New York, active from 1995-2009.

Formed in December 1995 in rural Minnesota, Mixel Pixel soon released their first home recorded 4 track cassettes, Lez Puff, Pastelogram, and Basement Mom.  Later, they relocated to Delaware where they spent the next 4 years recording their first LP called Mappyland.   Upon moving to New York in 1999, they made a string of homemade cut-and-paste rock LPs; Rainbow Panda, Contact Kid, Music For Plants, Let's Be Friends, and Highschool is not Hell.

In 2007 Mixel Pixel toured with Of Montreal.  Through the years they've also shared the stage with Man Man, Chromatics, Extreme Animals, Chairlift, Grand Buffet, Ra Ra Riot, Grizzly Bear, We Are Wolves, They Might Be Giants, HEALTH, and Pit er Pat.

Mixel Pixel have collaborated on music videos with paperrad, Noah Lyon, Ricardo Rivera, Radical Friend, and Devin Clark.

Mixel Pixel have remixed bands including Professor Murder and Of Montreal.

Discography

Official Albums

Mappy Land (2000)
Fake Violin Solo
Subhuman Levels
One Up
Go Mappy Land for U
Charlie 5000
Song Y
Polaroid Booth
Coney Island Bound Trash Train
(daphne's tape)
10 Ft. Coffin
Steamroller
Body Double
Cyclone Took My Baby

Rainbow Panda (2003)
Pink Shirts
My Animal
Desert Falcon
Silver Sparkle Amps
Holsters
Out of the Woods
_m
Psych Mo-Fo
Your No. 1
Oh! the Summer People
Boy with the Saddest Eyes
Perfect Little World
Body Automatic

Contact Kid (2004)
I Am the Contact Kid
Mantis Rock
Penny Rocket / Romantic
Little Wolverine
Tell Tale Drum Machine
Out of My Mind
At the Arcade
Gas House Gables
Pittsburgh Brain
The Drag City Starlet

Music for Plants (2006)
You're the Kind of Girl
Switchblade Sister
Coming Up X's
Black Van
I Cannot Die
Behind the Sun
Ghost for Life
Abandon Ship
These Mortality Pictures
Turkish Delights

Let's Be Friends (2008)
What Ever Happened to One
Sinking Feeling
Favorite Sweatshirt On
Great Invention
Let's Be Friends
Cats
You Could Be...
So Regal (Tigershark Kiss)
Fake Girlfriend
Last Song
Distant Station

Other releases

You're the Kind of Girl (digital ep 2006)
You're the Kind of Girl
What Are You Wearing? (Momus cover)
Personal Space Invaders
My Animal (Poingly Mix)

Coming Up X's (12" 2006)
Coming Up X's (Album Version)
Coming Up X's (Alan Astor Mix)
Coming Up X's (Streetlab Mix)
Coming Up X's (Poingly Mix)
X's Is the Reason (Books On Tape Mix)

You're the Kind of Girl (7" 2006)
You're the Kind of Girl
Artificial Kid

Sinking Feeling (digital single 2008)
Sinking Feeling
I've Been Around
My Summer World (with Lauren Winslow)

References

External links 
Official band website
 

Indie pop groups from New York (state)
Musical groups from Brooklyn